is a railway station in the city of  Iwaki, Fukushima, Japan, operated by East Japan Railway Company (JR East).

Lines
Iwaki Station is served by both the Jōban Line and the Banetsu East Line. From the Fukushima Daiichi nuclear disaster in March 2011 to March 2020, Iwaki Station became the northern terminus for limited express train services on the line.

Station layout
Iwaki Station is an elevated station with three opposed island platforms, connected by a footbridge. The station has a Midori no Madoguchi staffed ticket office.

Platforms

History
With the privatization of Japanese National Railways (JNR) on 1 April 1987, the station came under the control of JR East. It was renamed Iwaki on 3 December 1994. A new station building was completed on 19 June 2009.

Passenger statistics
In fiscal 2018, the station was used by an average of 5872 passengers daily (boarding passengers only).

Surrounding area

 Iwaki City Hall
 Iwakidaira Castle ruins
 Iinodaira Castle ruins
 Iino Hachimangu
 Matsugaoka Park

See also
 List of railway stations in Japan

References

External links

   

Stations of East Japan Railway Company
Railway stations in Fukushima Prefecture
Jōban Line
Ban'etsu East Line
Railway stations in Japan opened in 1897
Iwaki, Fukushima